John Cleveland is an American politician from Maine. Cleveland, a Democrat from Auburn, served as a State Senator from Maine's 15th District, representing much of Androscoggin County, including the population center of Auburn. Cleveland lost his re-election bid in 2014 to Republican Eric Brakey.

He was first elected to the Maine State Senate in 1990 and re-elected in 1992, 1994 and 1996 before being unable to seek re-election in 1998 due to term-limits. He was re-elected in 2012 after defeating incumbent Republican Lois Snowe-Mello. He graduated from Edward Little High School in Auburn and then the University of Southern Maine in 1982.

He served on the Auburn City Council from 1977 to 1981 and as Mayor of Auburn from 1981 to 1987.

References

1950 births
Living people
Democratic Party Maine state senators
University of Southern Maine alumni
Politicians from Auburn, Maine
Maine city council members
Mayors of places in Maine